Semion Aronovich Rotnitsky (December 28, 1915 — 2004) was a Soviet Russian painter, Honored Art worker of Tatar Republic, a member of the Saint Petersburg Union of Artists (before 1992 — the Leningrad Union of Artists), who lived and worked in Leningrad.

Rotnitsky is regarded as one of representatives of the Leningrad school of painting, most famous for his portrait paintings.  From 1948 through 1960 he was senior lecturer and director of the Kazan Art School.  His memoirs are titled "The Strength of the Beauty".

See also
 Leningrad School of Painting
 List of 20th-century Russian painters
 List of painters of Saint Petersburg Union of Artists
 Saint Petersburg Union of Artists

References

Sources 
 Кривенко И. «Ленинград» (раздел живописи) // Художник. 1965, № 3. С.27-36.
 Наш современник. Выставка произведений ленинградских художников. Каталог. — Л: Художник РСФСР, 1972. - с.19.
 Арбузов Г. С мыслью о родине. // Ленинградская правда, 1972, 10 октября.
 Мямлин И. Сердце с правдой вдвоём... / Ленинградская правда, 1975, 1 июня.
 Изобразительное искусство Ленинграда. Каталог выставки. — Л: Художник РСФСР, 1976. — с.28.
 Выставка произведений ленинградских художников, посвященная 60-летию Великого Октября. — Л: Художник РСФСР, 1982. — с.20.
 Левандовский С. Живопись на Ленинградской зональной // Искусство. 1981, № 2. С.63.
 Справочник членов Ленинградской организации Союза художников РСФСР. — Л: Художник РСФСР, 1987. — с.111.
 Семен Аронович Ротницкий. Выставка произведений. Каталог. — Л: Художник РСФСР, 1991.
 Matthew Cullerne Bown. A Dictionary of Twentieth Century Russian And Soviet Painters. 1900 — 1980s. — London: Izomar Limited, 1998.
 Ротницкий С. Сила красоты. Записки художника. СПб., 2000.
 Vern G. Swanson. Soviet Impressionism. - Woodbridge, England: Antique Collectors' Club, 2001. - Р. 172, 206.
 Юбилейный Справочник выпускников Санкт-Петербургского Государственного академического института живописи, скульптуры и архитектуры имени И. Е. Репина Российской Академии художеств. 1915—2005. СПб, 2007. С. 59.
 Ленинградская живописная школа. Соцреализм 1930—1980. СПб, Коломенская Верста, 2008.
 Иванов С. Инвестиции в советскую живопись: ленинградская школа // Петербургские искусствоведческие тетради. Вып. 31. СПб, 2014. С.54-60.

1915 births
2004 deaths
Soviet military personnel of World War II
20th-century Russian painters
Russian male painters
21st-century Russian painters
Soviet painters
Socialist realist artists
Leningrad School artists
Members of the Leningrad Union of Artists
Repin Institute of Arts alumni
Russian portrait painters
Russian people of Belarusian descent
20th-century Russian male artists
21st-century Russian male artists